Equus niobrarensis (or commonly, Niobrara horse) is an extinct species of Equus, the genus that includes the horse. E. niobrarensis may be synonymous with Equus scotti. It was "stout-legged" and belonged to the "big horses" category as defined by M. C. Winans. The skull of the horse was noted as being broader than Equus caballus.

Distribution
E. niobrarensis was native to North America and commonly found in western North America and dates to the late Pleistocene. Fossils of E. niobrarensis were discovered at Dry Cave in Wisconsin. Another mention of an E. niobrarensis discovery was in Skeleton Cave, Oregon.

References

Equus (genus)
Endemic fauna of the United States